Zhou Yan (born September 30, 1982; usually referred to in the media as Yan Zhou) is a Chinese curler. She plays lead for the Chinese national team, skipped by Wang Bingyu.

Zhou curled in her first tournament after having only curled for 2 years, at the 2002 Pacific Curling Championships. At that time she played third for the team.

Zhou has won 3 Pacific Championships, and a World Championship as a member of the team.

Teammates
2008 Vernon World Championships

2009 Gangneung World Championships

2010 Vancouver Olympic Games

Wang Bingyu, Skip

Liu Yin, Third

Yue Qingshuang, Second

Liu Jinli, Alternate

References

External links
 

1982 births
Living people
Chinese female curlers
Curlers at the 2010 Winter Olympics
Curlers at the 2014 Winter Olympics
Curlers at the 2018 Winter Olympics
Olympic bronze medalists for China
Olympic curlers of China
Sportspeople from Harbin
World curling champions
Olympic medalists in curling
Medalists at the 2010 Winter Olympics
Asian Games medalists in curling
Curlers at the 2007 Asian Winter Games
Curlers at the 2017 Asian Winter Games
Medalists at the 2007 Asian Winter Games
Medalists at the 2017 Asian Winter Games
Asian Games gold medalists for China
Asian Games bronze medalists for China
Universiade medalists in curling
Pacific-Asian curling champions
Universiade gold medalists for China
Competitors at the 2009 Winter Universiade
21st-century Chinese women